The following is a list of episodes of the Australian children's television series, Round the Twist. It premiered on 6 April 1990 and ended on 2 May 2001, with a total of 52 episodes over the course of 4 series.

Series overview

Episodes

Series 1 (1990)

Series 2 (1992)

Series 3 (2000)

Series 4 (2001)

References

Round the Twist episodes lists of
Lists of Australian children's television series episodes
Lists of Australian comedy television series episodes